NGC 2506 (also known as Caldwell 54) is a mildly-elongated open cluster of stars in the equatorial constellation of Monoceros, located at a distance of  from the Sun near the Galactic anti-center. It was discovered by William Herschel in 1791. It is of intermediate age, estimated at around two billion years.

At least 94 probable members have been identified within the field of NGC 2506 based upon their radial velocities. Compared to the Sun, the cluster is moderately metal-poor with an iron abundance of [Fe/H] = –0.3 dex. It shows indications of mass segregation, with the lower mass members being more likely to be in the outer parts of the cluster. This is the result of exchange of kinetic energy during encounters between the members. Twelve blue straggler stars have been located in the cluster, with three of them showing short-period oscillation. Fourteen Gamma Doradus variables have been found, as well as two detached eclipsing binaries, and three Delta Scuti stars.

References

External links
 
 

NGC 2506
NGC 2506
2506
054
Astronomical objects discovered in 1791